Brady Seals is the self-titled second album by American country music singer Brady Seals. It is his second release independently of the band Little Texas, of which he was a member until 1995. The album includes the singles "I Fell", "Whole Lotta Hurt" and "The Best Is Yet to Come". All three singles charted on the Billboard country charts, although they all missed Top 40.

Track listing
"Whole Lotta Hurt" (Jamie O'Hara, Brady Seals) – 2:47
"Country as a Boy Can Be" (Tommy Barnes, Greg McDowell, B. Seals) – 3:22
"The Best Is Yet to Come" (Rodney Crowell, B. Seals) – 3:54
"Summer Night Lovin' You" (B. Seals) – 3:17
"I Fell" (Barnes) – 3:33
"Love You Too Much" (O'Hara, B. Seals) – 2:49
"You're My Kind of Woman" (Barnes, B. Seals) – 3:03
"All My Devotion" (O'Hara, B. Seals) – 4:00
"Kickin' and Screamin'" (John Greenebaum, Eddie Setser, Troy Seals) – 4:11
"I Get High Lovin' You" (Barnes) – 4:00

Personnel
 Sam Bacco – percussion
 Eddie Bayers – drums
 Tim Buppert – background vocals
 Max Carl – background vocals
 John Cowan – background vocals
 Rodney Crowell – background vocals
 Stuart Duncan – fiddle
 Béla Fleck – banjo
 Paul Franklin – steel guitar
 Vince Gill – background vocals
 Tony Harrell – keyboards
 John Hobbs – Hammond organ, piano
 Liana Manis – background vocals
 Carl Marsh – string arrangements
 Michael Rhodes – bass guitar
 Chris Rodriguez – acoustic guitar, background vocals
 Timothy B. Schmit – background vocals
 Brady Seals – lead vocals
 Ricky Skaggs – background vocals
 Steuart Smith – electric guitar
 Biff Watson – acoustic guitar

References
Allmusic

1998 albums
Brady Seals albums
Warner Records albums
Albums produced by Rodney Crowell